Crecco is an Italian surname. Notable people with the surname include:

Luca Crecco (born 1995), Italian footballer
Marion Crecco (1930–2015), American politician

Italian-language surnames